Sells Park, also known as Sells' City Park or Sells' Park; historically officially, still colloquially, and all collectively known as Athens Pond, Athens City Pond, or Athens' Pond, is a public park in Athens, Ohio, near Ohio University. It is claimed to be "one of Athens’s best hidden treasures." It comprises , and includes Sells Pond (informally known as Athens Pond Pond), a  pond.

Park trails

Sells Park is part of The Athens Trail Network, a multi-use trail network branching out from Sells Park itself. A series of twelve trails and connectors branch out into the surrounding woods, heading eastwards to eventually connect with the trails of Strouds Run State Park. The trails are designed for hiking, running, and biking, although some sections are off-limits to bicycles. 

There are wooden markers along the trails which provide information. There are also signs at forks which show the trails' names and where they lead to in each direction. The trails provide scenic views of the East State commercial area and travel past and through notable features such as Sells Pond, Riddle State Nature Preserve (Hawk Woods), Boulder Cove, Turtlehead Cave (Blue Ash Rockhouse), Finger Rock, Pioneer Cemetery, and Dow Lake at Strouds Run State Park. 

The trail network is maintained by community and university volunteers.

History
Sells Park was formerly owned by the Sells family, until it was given to the United States in 1939. It was later ceded by the United States to Athens, Ohio, in 1979. 

About 3 yards behind a bench commemorated in 2011 on the right side of the lake, there is a barely visible cement foundation of an old male and female bathroom building which once stood there, taken down some time in the 1990s.

On the side of the pond closest to the two paths that lead up to the park, there is a cement support structure of a platform which you could fish from.

References

External links
 Trail map
 U.S. Geological Survey Map at the U.S. Geological Survey Map Website. Retrieved November 5th, 2022.

Protected areas of Athens County, Ohio
1939 establishments in Ohio
Athens, Ohio